McIlvaine is a surname of Scottish origin, and refers to:

Abraham Robinson McIlvaine (1804–1863), American politician, U.S. congressman from Pennsylvania
Robinson McIlvaine (1913–2001), US diplomat
Charles McIlvaine (mycologist) (1840–1909), American author and mycologist
Charles Pettit McIlvaine (1799–1873), American Episcopalian bishop and author
Jim McIlvaine (born 1972), American basketball player
Joseph McIlvaine (1769–1826), American politician, U.S. senator from New Jersey
Theodore Clinton McIlvaine (1875–1959), American agronomist
Thomas McIlvaine (1854–1933), American illustrator